This is a list of Brazilian television related events from 2002.

Events
29 January - The television reality show Big Brother Brasil debuts in Brazil.
2 April - The first season of Big Brother Brasil is won by Kléber de Paula.
30 June -Brazil beat Germany 2-0 to win the 2002 World Cup at Yokohama, Japan.
6 July - Vanessa Jackson wins the first season of FAMA.
23 July - Rodrigo Leonel wins the second season of Big Brother Brasil.

Debuts
29 January - Big Brother Brasil (2002–present)
27 April - FAMA (2002-2005)

Television shows

1970s
Turma da Mônica (1976–present)

1990s
Malhação (1995–present)
Cocoricó (1996–present)

2000s
Sítio do Picapau Amarelo (2001–2007)

Ending this year

Births

Deaths

See also
2002 in Brazil
List of Brazilian films of 2002